Stigmodera macularia, is a species of beetle in the family Buprestidae restricted to Southeastern Australia.

Description
Stigmodera macularia have yellow elytra with a deeply pitted surface.  The puncturations are colored in black and the pronotum is dark.

Gallery

Distribution
This species can be found mainly in Victoria and New South Wales.

References

Buprestidae
Beetles described in 1805